Juan Gustavo Scheps Grandal (Montevideo, 1 December 1954) is a Uruguayan architect and professor.

In 2009 he was elected Dean of the School of Architecture, University of the Republic. He was reelected in 2013.

Works
Family houses (with Martha Barreira), 1981–2008.
Refurbishing of the old Machinery Hall of the School of Engineering, 1994–1998.
Ciudad de las Tres Cruces (with Carriquiry, Falkenstein, Nogueira, Tuzman, Urruzola), 1995–2004.
Centro Regional Norte, Universidad de la República, Salto (with Ana Fazakas), 1996–2002.
Restoration of Julio Vilamajó's home and studio, 2007–2008.

Publications
Redes invisibles (1996)
Puerto (2002)

References

External links
 Decano Gustavo Scheps: “restituir a la arquitectura como dimensión cultural”
 El plano técnico: opiniones del decano de Arquitectura sobre los planes de emergencia habitacional

1954 births
Uruguayan architects
University of the Republic (Uruguay) alumni
Academic staff of the University of the Republic (Uruguay)
Polytechnic University of Madrid alumni
Living people